The 1978 Austrian motorcycle Grand Prix was the third round of the 1978 Grand Prix motorcycle racing season. It took place on the weekend of 28–30 April 1978 at the Salzburgring.

Classification

500 cc

350cc

125cc

Sidecar classification

References

Austrian motorcycle Grand Prix
Austrian
Motorcycle Grand Prix